Pernille is a Danish and Norwegian female given name derived from Petronella, and may refer to:

Pernille Dupont, retired female badminton player from Denmark
Pernille Fischer Christensen (born 1969), Danish film director and sister of actor Stine Fischer Christensen
Pernille Harder (badminton) (born 1977), female badminton player from Denmark
Pernille Harder (footballer) (born 1993), female association football player from Denmark
Pernille Holmboe (born 1977), Norwegian model, living in London
Pernille Kaae Høier (born 1991), Danish actress
Pernille Nedergaard (born 1967), retired female badminton player from Denmark
Pernille Rose Grønkjær (born 1973), Danish film director
Pernille Rosenkrantz-Theil (born 1977), former member of Folketinget (Danish parliament) for the Red-Green Alliance
Pernille Sams (born 1959), Danish real estate agent, lawyer and politician
Pernille Skipper, (born 1984), Danish politician, Folketing member, and political spokesperson for the Red-Green Alliance since 2016
Pernille Vermund (born 1975), Danish politician and architect
Pernille Weiss (born 1968), Danish politician

See also
 Pernilla, the corresponding Swedish name
 Perilla

Given names
Feminine given names
Danish feminine given names
Norwegian feminine given names